Richard Sanderson Amery (born 31 March 1951) is an Australian former politician. He was a Labor Party member of the New South Wales Legislative Assembly from 1983 to 2015, representing the electorates of Riverstone (1983-1991) and Mount Druitt (1991-2015).

Early career
Prior to entering politics, Amery spent several years in the retail industry before becoming a police officer with New South Wales Police, where he served for 13 years. At the time he resigned to take up his political work he was a senior constable.

Parliamentary career 
Amery was the Minister for Agriculture from 1995 to 1997, when he was allocated additional responsibilities as Minister for Land and Water Conservation. He served as minister in both portfolios until 2001, when the Land and Water Conservation was allocated to another minister and Amery took on Corrective Services.

Amery returned to the backbench following the 2003 election, as part of a larger reshuffle which also saw the departure of Ministers John Aquilina (who became Speaker) and Paul Whelan (who retired from Parliament).

As the longest-serving member of the New South Wales Legislative Assembly, Amery is bestowed a colloquial title, Father of the House.
On 8 August 2014 Richard Amery announced that he would leave politics at the next NSW state election in 2015.

Notes

 

1951 births
Australian Labor Party members of the Parliament of New South Wales
Labor Right politicians
Australian police officers
Living people
Members of the New South Wales Legislative Assembly
Politicians from Sydney
20th-century Australian politicians
21st-century Australian politicians